Burning for Buddy, Volume 1 is a 1994 Buddy Rich tribute album produced by Rush drummer/lyricist Neil Peart.  The album is composed of performances by various rock and jazz drummers, all accompanied by the Buddy Rich Big Band.  A follow-up Burning for Buddy...Volume 2 recording was released in 1997 and both recording sessions were also covered in a 5-hour documentary DVD video released in 2006, The Making of Burning for Buddy....

Track listing
"Dancing Men" – 6:37
Drums performed by Simon Phillips
"Mercy, Mercy, Mercy" – 5:09
Drums performed by Dave Weckl
"Love for Sale" – 4:30
Drums performed by Steve Gadd
"Beulah Witch" – 4:28
Drums performed by Matt Sorum
"Nutville" – 5:09
Drums performed by Steve Smith
"Cotton Tail" – 4:36
Drums performed by Neil Peart
"No Jive" – 5:46
Drums performed by Manu Katche and Mino Cinelu
"Milestones" – 5:03 (composed by Miles Davis, arr. Herbie Phillips)
Drums performed by Billy Cobham
"The Drum Also Waltzes, Pt. 1" – 1:04
Drums performed by Max Roach
"Machine" – 3:46
Drums performed by Rod Morgenstein
"Straight, No Chaser" – 3:39
Drums performed by Kenny Aronoff
"Slow Funk" – 5:33
Drums performed by Omar Hakim
"Shawnee" – 3:06
Drums performed by Ed Shaughnessy
"Drumorello" – 3:11
Drums performed by Joe Morello
"The Drum Also Waltzes, Pt. 2" – :44
Drums performed by Max Roach
"Lingo" – 4:31
Drums performed by Bill Bruford
"Ya Gotta Try" – 3:18
Drums performed by Marvin "Smitty" Smith
"Pick Up the Pieces" – 5:38
Drums performed by Steve Ferrone

Neil Peart albums
1994 albums
Buddy Rich tribute albums
Atlantic Records albums